Ehrlich is an extinct town in Skagit County, in the U.S. state of Washington.

A post office called Ehrlich was established in 1896, and remained in operation until 1915. The community was named after F. O. Ehrlich, the proprietor of a local mill.

References

Ghost towns in Washington (state)
Geography of Skagit County, Washington